The 1990–91 NCAA Division I men's basketball rankings was made up of two human polls, the AP Poll and the Coaches Poll, in addition to various other preseason polls.

Legend

AP Poll

Coaches Poll 
The Coaches poll expanded to 25 teams beginning with the 1990–91 season.

References 

1990-91 NCAA Division I men's basketball rankings
College men's basketball rankings in the United States